Huating is a county-level city, formerly Huating County, in the east of Gansu province, China, bordering Ningxia to the northwest. It is under the administration of the Pingliang City. Its postal code is 744100, and in 1999 its population was 176,941 people.

Huating was first established in 605 CE, the first year of the Daye era, Sui dynasty. It is named after Huajian Mountain. In 2018 Huating County was upgraded to Huating county-level city.

Huating has long been a center of coal mining and porcelain production in Gansu. In 2006 it produced over 14 million tons of coal. The agriculture output of Huating is centered around walnuts, medicinal plants, in particular Ligusticum striatum, and beef cattle.

In July 2010 13 people died in Huating County in a landslide triggered by heavy rains. Two people survived.

Administrative divisions
Huating City is divided to 1 subdistricts, 7 towns, 3 townships and 1 others.
Subdistricts
 Donghua

Towns

Townships
 Shenyu Township()
 Shanzhai Township()
 Yanxia Township

Others
 Shibaozi Development Zone Management Committee()

Climate

See also
 List of administrative divisions of Gansu

References

 

Huating County
Pingliang